Arkady Mikhailovich Arkanov (7 June 1933 – 22 March 2015) was a Russian writer, doctor, playwright and stand-up comedian.

Biography
Arkanov was born Arkady Mikhailovich Steinbock in Kyiv, USSR. At the onset of World War II in 1941, he was evacuated to Siberia, together with his mother and younger brother. In April 1943, the family was reunited with their father in Moscow.

In 1957, Arkanov graduated from the I.M. Sechenov First Moscow State Medical University and, before becoming a writer, worked as a family doctor. Between 1963 and 1967, he was a satirist at the journal Yunost. In 1966, he changed his last name, and in 1968 became a member of the Union of Soviet Writers. In the 1960s–70s, he collaborated with Grigori Gorin, with whom he wrote several plays for the Moscow Theater of Satire.

Arkanov's first marriage was to Maya Kristalinskaya, a singer in 1967. After their divorce, Arkanov married Yevgeniya Morozova.
He had a son, Vasily Arkadievich Arkanov (born 1967), a Russian-English translator and journalist who has lived in New York since 1993. He was a holder of the title People's Artist of Russia and awarded the Order of Honour.

References

External links

1933 births
2015 deaths
Writers from Kyiv
Actors from Kyiv
Television presenters from Kyiv
Theatre people from Kyiv
Russian male comedians
Russian satirists
Jewish Russian writers
Recipients of the Order of Honour (Russia)
People's Artists of Russia
I.M. Sechenov First Moscow State Medical University alumni
Soviet physicians